Anthony (died 302 AD) was an early Christian priest who suffered martyrdom with Anastasius, Julian, Celsus and Marcionilla during the Diocletianic Persecution. Denouncing the Roman way of life, he lived as a desert hermit, practiced celibacy, lived off roots and plants, and shunned any visitors he received. Anthony wished to live his life in complete solidarity with God.

References

External links
 "Saint Anthony of Antioch" at the Christian Iconography website

302 deaths
4th-century Christian martyrs
4th-century Romans
266 births
Christians martyred during the reign of Diocletian